Nyctimystes dux is a species of frog in the subfamily Pelodryadinae. This fairly large tree frog is mainly green. It is endemic to the Huon Peninsula in Papua New Guinea. It was separated from Litoria graminea by Richards & Oliver, 2006.

References

dux
Amphibians described in 2006
Taxobox binomials not recognized by IUCN